Daniella Wallcott (born March 13, 1991) is a Trinidadian model and artistic painter. She won the 2016 edition of Miss Trinidad and Tobago beauty pageant and represented Trinidad and Tobago at Miss World 2016.
Family Daniella has two younger sisters, Victoria Walcott and Laura Walcott. Her parents are Gregory and Claire Walcott. She is cousins with former Miss Trinidad 2008 Gabrielle Walcott.

Early life and education
Walcott was born in Trinidad but had her early childhood at Scarborough, Tobago. She was a student at the University of Trinidad and Tobago where she studied Theatre Design and Production and graduated in November 2017.

Career
She once worked for a Trinidadian insurance company as an assistant project manager before she took up a job as creative manager of LaVida Fashion Boutique in 2012. Her love for painting made her open her own company, Daniella Walcott Creations.

Pageantry

Miss Trinidad and Tobago 2016
On April 8, 2016, she won the Miss Trinidad and Tobago 2016 pageantry and was crowned by her predecessor Kimberly Farrah Singh.

References

1992 births
Living people
Trinidad and Tobago beauty pageant winners
Trinidad and Tobago female models
Trinidad and Tobago women artists
Trinidad and Tobago businesspeople
Miss World 2016 delegates
University of Trinidad and Tobago alumni
Trinidad and Tobago artists